Goodenia mueckeana  is a species of flowering plant in the family Goodeniaceae and is endemic to central Australia. It is an ascending, perennial herb with toothed, linear to egg-shaped leaves and racemes or thyrses of yellow flowers.

Description

Taxonomy and naming
Goodenia mueckeana was first formally described in 1873 by Ferdinand von Mueller in Fragmenta Phytographiae Australiae.
The specific epithet (mueckeana) honours Carl Muecke.

Distribution and habitat
This goodenia grows in hummock grassland on sandplains and sand dunes in central Western Australia, the south-west of the Northern Territory and the far north-west of South Australia.

Conservation status
Goodenia mueckeana is classified as "not threatened" by the Government of Western Australia Department of Parks and Wildlife and as of "least concern" under the Northern Territory Government Territory Parks and Wildlife Conservation Act 1976.

References

mueckeana
Eudicots of Western Australia
Flora of the Northern Territory
Flora of South Australia
Plants described in 1873
Taxa named by Ferdinand von Mueller
Endemic flora of Western Australia